Liu Yuan or Liuyuan may refer to:

People
Liu Yuan (Han Zhao) (died 310), Xiongnu leader who became the founding emperor of Former Han (Han Zhao)
Liu Yuan (PRC general) (born 1951), general and politician of the People's Republic of China
Liu Yuan (musician) (born 1960), Chinese jazz musician
Liu Yuan (boxer) (born 1979), Chinese boxer
Liu Yuan (table tennis)

Places in China
 Liuyuan, Gansu (柳园), town in Guazhou County, Gansu
 Liuyuan, Hebei (柳园), town in Linzhang County, Hebei
 Liuyuan, Shandong (榴园), town in Yicheng District, Zaozhuang, Shandong
 Liuyuan Township (流源乡), in Guidong County, Hunan
 Liuyuan Subdistrict, Shandong (柳园街道), in Dongchangfu District, Liaocheng, Shandong
 Lingering Garden (留園), a Chinese garden in Suzhou, Jiangsu